Zouhaier Attia(born 28 June 1989) is a Tunisian footballer. He is right-footed and played the primary position of an attacking midfielder, but also worked the roles of left and right winger. He began his career on August 13, 2014, when he played in his first game with the club AS (Association Sportive) Djerba. Attia played with AS Djerba for one season, and on July 1, 2015, he transferred to the club ES Zarzis. He played two season with the club until he again transferred, this time to AS (Avenir Sportif) de Gabès. Zouhaier played with AS Gabès from July 1, 2017 to December 19, 2018. He then made his final transfer, and joined US (Union Sportive) Ben Guerdane. After nearly two years of play for US Ben Guerdane, Attia left the club and has been without a club since October 1, 2020. Attia also has no record of serious injury or absences from games.

Statistics 
Throughout his six-year-long career, Zouhaier Attia played the most games (49) for ES Zarzis, his second club, and played the least games (19) for AS Gabès, his third club. Attia scored a cumulative six goals across 111 games, scoring zero goals during his 21-game tenure with US Ben Guerdane, one during his 19 games at AS Gabès, two in 49 games at ES Zarzis, and lastly, two goals in his 22 games at AS Djerba. While Attia received eight yellow cards in his career, he was not once ejected during a game, from neither two yellow cards nor one red card. Out of all 111 games played, Attia was an on-field starter in 71 of them.

References

1989 births
Living people
Tunisian footballers
AS Djerba players
ES Zarzis players
AS Gabès players
US Ben Guerdane players
Association football midfielders
Tunisian Ligue Professionnelle 1 players